Cedar is a small community in the Canadian province of British Columbia.

The village was so named because of the profusion of Thuja plicata trees in its vicinity, known as the Western Red Cedar. Cedar as a locality existed prior to 1888, as on April 1, that year, a post office was opened.

To the north of Cedar, three Snuneymuxw First Nation Indian reserves, Nanaimo River 2, 3, and 4, border the community.

Nearby parks include Nanaimo River Regional Park, Morden Colliery Historic Provincial Park, and Hemer Provincial Park.

See also
List of communities in British Columbia
Cable Bay Trail

References

Unincorporated settlements in British Columbia
Populated places on the British Columbia Coast
Populated places in the Regional District of Nanaimo
Mid Vancouver Island
Designated places in British Columbia